Northwest Indian College (Xwlemi Elh>Tal>Nexw Squl) is a public tribal land-grant community college in Bellingham, Washington.  It was established by the Lummi Nation and is the only accredited tribal college or university serving reservation communities of Washington, Oregon, and Idaho.

History

NWIC was created in response to the higher education needs of American Indians, particularly geographically isolated populations that have no other means accessing education beyond the high school level.

The institution began in 1973 as the Lummi Indian School of Aquaculture, which was established to provide local technicians for employment in Indian-owned and operated fish and shellfish hatcheries in the United States and Canada. In 1983, the Lummi Nation chartered the Lummi Community College to fulfill the need for a more comprehensive post-secondary education for tribal members.

The Lummi Community College campaigned for accreditation by the Northwest Commission on Colleges and Universities in 1988. The commission affirmed accreditation in 1993, and Lummi Community College became Northwest Indian College. One year later, the college was designated a land-grant college alongside 31 other tribal colleges.

Years of program expansion and dedication resulted in the college gaining accreditation by the Northwest Commission on Colleges and Universities as a four-year, baccalaureate degree-granting institution, effective September 2008.

NWIC's president since 2012 is Justin Guillory (Nez Perce Tribe), from the Nez Perce Indian Reservation in Lapwai, Idaho.

Academics

NWIC offers Bachelor of Arts, Bachelor of Science, Associate of Arts and Sciences, Associate of Science (Transfer), Associate of Applied Science (Transfer), and Associate of Technical Arts degrees. As of 2011, it was one of seven tribal colleges in the U.S. to offer a degree related to tribal administration.

The college is an open enrollment school, meaning no SAT or ACT scores are needed to apply.

Campus

Northwest Indian College is an accredited four-year college located on the Lummi Indian Reservation in Washington state, near the city of Bellingham. In addition the NWIC's main campus in Lummi, the college has six sites located in Swinomish, Tulalip, Port Gamble S'Klallam, Muckleshoot, Nisqually, and Nez Perce.

Partnerships
NWIC is a member of the American Indian Higher Education Consortium (AIHEC), which is a community of tribe- and federal-chartered institutions working to strengthen tribal nations and make a lasting difference in the lives of American Indians and Alaska Natives.

Scholarships are available through the American Indian College Fund (AICF) and the NWIC Foundation.

References

External links
 

American Indian Higher Education Consortium
Universities and colleges in Bellingham, Washington
Universities and colleges in Whatcom County, Washington
1973 establishments in Washington (state)
Educational institutions established in 1973
Universities and colleges accredited by the Northwest Commission on Colleges and Universities
Land-grant universities and colleges